Tina Isabel Gustafsson (born 30 September 1962 in Norrköping, Östergötland) is a former Swedish freestyle swimmer. She won a silver medal in 4 × 100 m freestyle relay at the 1980 Summer Olympics in Moscow along with Carina Ljungdahl, Agneta Mårtensson and Agneta Eriksson.

Personal bests

Long course (50 m)

Clubs
Norrköpings KK

References
 Profile

Olympic swimmers of Sweden
Swimmers at the 1980 Summer Olympics
Olympic silver medalists for Sweden
1962 births
Living people
Swedish female freestyle swimmers
Medalists at the 1980 Summer Olympics
Olympic silver medalists in swimming
Sportspeople from Norrköping
20th-century Swedish women
21st-century Swedish women